Isaac Chelo (also Hilo, Hilu or Khelo), in Hebrew יצחק חילו, was a rabbi of the 14th century. His place of residence is unclear. Carmoly wrote "Laresa du royaume d'Aragon", which Scholem interpreted as an erroneous spelling of Lerida. However, Shapira took it to mean Larissa in Thessaly.  Chelo is famous for an itinerary of the Holy Land first published in 1847. However, the document is now commonly considered a 19th-century forgery.

Chelo's Itinerary
In 1847, the controversial French scholar Carmoly published an account Les chemins de Jérusalem (The Roads from Jerusalem), purporting to be Chelo's description of Jerusalem and seven roads leading from it, written in 1334. An English translation was published by Adler in 1930. 

Carmoly wrote that the original Hebrew manuscript was in his own library, but when his library was catalogued after his death no such manuscript was found.

Scholem examined the library in 1925 and found nine lines of an 18th-century copy of the Itinerary. He charged that the Itinerary had a number of anachronisms, contradictions, and quotations from Kabbalistic works postdating Chelo. On this basis, Scholem judged the Itinerary to be a forgery, written or greatly expanded by Carmoly himself. This assessment has been accepted by Mikhal Ish-Shalom, Dan Shapira, Joshua Prawer and Yoel Elitsur. 

Prawer also alleged that there was no Jewish community in Hebron at the time the Itinerary claimed to describe one. Prawer wrote that "This itinerary is unfortunately still being quoted by unwary scholars, even though the forgery was proved almost 50 years ago."

References

Holy Land travellers
14th-century Sephardi Jews
Explorers of Asia
Jewish explorers
Medieval Jewish travel writers
Pilgrimage accounts
People from Larissa
Spanish explorers
Sephardi rabbis
14th-century writers
19th-century hoaxes
Literary forgeries
1847 books